The Payload Assist Module (PAM) is a modular upper stage designed and built by McDonnell Douglas (now Boeing), using Thiokol Star-series solid propellant rocket motors. The PAM was used with the Space Shuttle, Delta, and Titan launchers and carried satellites from low Earth orbit to a geostationary transfer orbit or an interplanetary course. The payload was spin stabilized by being mounted on a rotating plate.  Originally developed for the Space Shuttle, different versions of the PAM were developed:
 PAM-A (Atlas class), development terminated; originally to be used on both the Atlas and Space Shuttle
 PAM-D (Delta class), uses a Star-48B rocket motor
 PAM-DII (Delta class), uses a Star-63 rocket motor
 PAM-S (Special) as a kick motor for the space probe Ulysses

The PAM-D module, used as the third stage of the Delta II rocket, was the last version in use. As of 2018, no PAM is in active use on any rockets.

2001 re-entry incident 
On January 12, 2001, a PAM-D module re-entered the atmosphere after a "catastrophic orbital decay". The PAM-D stage, which had been used to launch the GPS satellite 2A-11 in 1993, crashed in the sparsely populated Saudi Arabian desert, where it was positively identified.

Gallery

References

External links 

 Payload Assist Module at the NASA Shuttle Reference Manual
 Payload Assist Module at GlobalSecurity.org

Solid-fuel rockets
Rocket stages
Articles containing video clips